Landskron may refer to

Castles
 Landskron Castle (Carinthia), in Austria 
 Château de Landskron, in Alsace, France
 Veste Landskron, in Ostvorpommern, Germany
 Landskron Castle, in Bad Neuenahr, Eiffel, Germany
 Landskron Castle, in Oppenheim, Germany
 Landskron Castle, in Bruck an der Mur, Styria, Austria

Places
 Landskron, Villach, Carinthia, Austria

People
 Münch von Landskron, a family name in the Münch (family lineage)

See also

 Landskrone (disambiguation)
 Landskrona, a town in Sweden 
 Landeskrone, a hill near Görlitz, Germany
 Lanškroun, Czech Republic
 Lanckorona, Poland